Tessaracoccus oleiagri is a bacterium from the genus Tessaracoccus which has been isolated from crude oil contaminated saline soil from the Shengli Oilfield.

References 

Propionibacteriales
Bacteria described in 2011